The Hyena’s Sun (originally as Soleil des Hyènes), is a 1977 Dutch-Tunisian drama film directed by Ridha Behi and produced by Willem Thijssen. The film stars Salah Benmoussa	and Hélène Catzaras in the lead roles whereas Larbi Doghmi, Tewfik Guiga, Mahmoud Moursy and Ahmed Snoussi made supportive roles. The film deals with changes occur within the residents of a small Tunisian fishing village when a resort is built by German merchants.

The film made its premier on 2 March 1978 in the Netherlands. The film received mixed reviews from critics. In 1977, the film was nominated for the Golden Charybdis award at the Taormina International Film Festival. The film was selected for the Directors' Fortnight of the Cannes Film Festival the same year. In 1979, director won the grand prize at the Damascus International Film Festival and the Truth Prize at the 6th Panafrican Film and Television Festival of Ouagadougou (FESPACO).

Cast
 Salah Benmoussa		
 Hélène Catzaras as Mariem
 Larbi Doghmi as Haj Ibrahim (as Doghmi Larbi)
 Tewfik Guiga as Slim
 Mahmoud Moursy as Lamine
 Ahmed Snoussi as Tahar
 El Ghazi		
 Mohamed El Habachi
 Mohamed Jalali		
 Mohammed Mehdi		
 Mourad Methkal		
 El Omari as Omda
 Aicha Rachidi		
 Mustapha Zaari

References

External links 
 

Tunisian drama films
1977 films
1977 drama films
Dutch drama films